Comin' Out Hard is the debut studio album by American hip hop duo Eightball & MJG.  The album was released on August 17, 1993, by Suave House Records.

Track listing

Personnel
Tony Draper – Executive Producer
Eightball – Vocals
James Endsley – Executive Producer
Fresh – Engineer, Mastering, Mixing
MJG – Vocals
Kid Style – Design
T-Money – Engineer, Mastering, Mixing
Bruce "Grim" Rhodes - DJ
Pen & Pixel - Cover art

Charts

References

1993 debut albums
8Ball & MJG albums